
Gmina Osięciny is a rural gmina (administrative district) in Radziejów County, Kuyavian-Pomeranian Voivodeship, in north-central Poland.

Villages
Gmina Osięciny contains the villages and settlements of Bartłomiejowice, Bełszewo, Bełszewo-Kolonia, Bilno, Bodzanówek, Borucin, Borucinek, Jarantowice, Karolin, Konary, Kościelna Wieś, Krotoszyn, Latkowo, Lekarzewice, Leonowo, Nagórki, Osięciny, Osłonki, Pieńki Kościelskie, Pilichowo, Pocierzyn, Powałkowice, Pułkownikowo, Ruszki, Samszyce, Sęczkowo, Szalonki, Ujma Mała, Witoldowo, Włodzimierka, Wola Skarbkowa, Zagajewice, Żakowice, Zblęg and Zielińsk.

Neighbouring gminas
Gmina Osięciny is bordered by the gminas of Bądkowo, Brześć Kujawski, Bytoń, Dobre, Lubraniec, Radziejów, Topólka and Zakrzewo.

References
Polish official population figures 2006

Osieciny
Radziejów County